Shojae Khalilzadeh (born 14 May 1989) is an Iranian professional footballer who plays as a centre-back for Qatar Stars League club Al Ahli and Iran national team. He is known for his pace, artistic tackles and positional sense.

Khalilzadeh starting his career in Kerman where he moved to two clubs, first joining Mes Rafsanjan and then signing with Mes Kerman in 2010. His performance earned him a transfer to Sepahan Isfahan in 2013 and spent four years with Talaei Pooshan, which included a successful loan spell with Tractor in Tabriz. In May 2017, Khalilzadeh joined Persepolis side that he helped turn into one of the strongest on the continent, before joining Qatari side Al-Rayyan in October 2020.

Club career

Early years in Mazandaran
At the age of 16, Khalilzadeh started playing football with local youth teams for three years.

Mes Rafsanjan and Kerman
Khalilzadeh began his professional career with Mes Rafsanjan in 2008. He spent two seasons at Mes Rafsanjan in Azadegan League. In late June 2010, Khalilzadeh joined Iran Pro League side Mes Kerman. He made a debut for the club under coach Samad Marfavi in the league 2010–11 season. In his second season, under Croatian coach Miroslav Blažević, he reached with the team the semi-finals of the 2011–12 Hazfi Cup. In June 2012, Khalilzadeh extended his contract for a third season a worth R800m. His performance did not go unnoticed, as Esteghlal, Persepolis and Sepahan teams showed interest in signing of the defender.

Sepahan and Tractor
In late June 2013, Khalilzadeh was presented as a player of Isfahani club Sepahan on a four-year contract. In his first season, under Croatian coach Zlatko Kranjčar, he formed a partnership in the heart of the Sepahan defensive with the captain Hadi Aghily. He helped the team to won of the 2014–15 Persian Gulf Pro League.

Khalilzadeh was loaned to Tractor to complete his mandatory military service. He was one of the best players under coach Amir Ghalenoei, the club reached the top of their group at the 2016 AFC Champions League, outperforming the Saudi giant Al-Hilal. He returned to Sepahan at the end of the loan spell in July 2016.

Sepahan coach Abdollah Veisi talking about efforts to move Khalilzadeh to Persepolis in the 2016–17 season.

Persepolis
 On 6 May 2017, it was confirmed that Khalilzadeh would join the Persian Gulf Pro League champions Persepolis on a two-year contract to play under Croatian coach Branko Ivanković. In his debut match in the league, he scored his first goal against Foolad Khuzestan. He scored his second goal for Persepolis in the 2017 AFC Champions League quarter-finals match against Al Ahli. Persepolis reached the semi-final for the first time in its history before FIFA imposed sanctions on the team's top scorer and the club. In his first season with the red half of Tehran, Persepolis, Khalilzadeh played 41 games and scored five goals.

The following year was the most successful in Persepolis history against all odds, the Reds finished runner-up in the 2018 AFC Champions League. Khalilzadeh was selected in two squads "Team of the Season" for his performance in the tournament.

Persepolis was scoreless with Al Ahli on Matchday Three 2019 AFC Champions League, when Khalilzadeh showed superb agility to adjust his body and acrobatically bicycle kick home the opening goal, which was named as the best goal of the 2019 AFC Champions League by the fans. He scored two goals in the competition but his team were eliminated of the group stage.

In the 2020 AFC Champions League, the last tournament before increasing the number of clubs to 40 teams, Khalilzadeh’s goal in the final minutes of the Al Taawoun match was a leap for the team after a faltering start in the tournament. In the Round of 16 against Al-Sadd, the role and interventions of Khalilzadeh in the game were more influential, before Persepolis scored the winning goal in the 89th minute. He was also "Player of the Week" at the AFC Champions League semi-final following his performance in his last match with the team against Al Nassr and help Persepolis to reach the final, where the east champion was determined on 13 December.

Khalilzadeh played a great role in winning three titles in the Iran Pro League and helped Persepolis to reach AFC Champions League final twice in three years. Since 2018, Khalilzadeh has been linked with a move to the Qatar Stars League and the Chinese Super League. At the age of 31, before the start of the 2020–21 season, after not reaching an agreement to renew his contract, he moved to Qatar. Khalilzadeh was reportedly chosen as one of the candidates for the 2020 Asian Footballer of the Year award before the award was confirmed to be cancelled in late December.

Al-Rayyan
On 25 October 2020, Al-Rayyan announced on the last day of the summer transfer window the signing of Khalilzadeh on a two-year contract a worth $700,000. It was his first career stop outside of his home country and became the second Iranian to play for Al-Rayyan since 1980s, after his former coach Ghasempour. Under the coach Aguirre, he played a central defender, and Mercado moved to the right-back in the following games. He scored his first goal with a side volley shot in a 2–1 victory against Qatar SC on 12 January 2021. The following week, Khalilzadeh scored his second goal with a counter-attack in a 3–0 win against Al-Wakrah. As a defender and deep-lying playmaker behind the midfield, he played 26 games and scored three goals. Al-Rayyan finished third in the league. In late October 2021, Khalilzadeh extended his contract with the club until 2023.

International career
Khalilzadeh was invited to Iran national team in 2012 by Carlos Queiroz. He made his debut for the Team Melli in a 6–1 victory against Tajikistan national team.

After seven years of notable absence from the international side, during the time of Queiroz and Marc Wilmots, Khalilzadeh was call-up by new coach Dragan Skočić in 2020 for a friendlies against Uzbekistan and Bosnia and Herzegovina, and to help in a difficult situation, after the failure in the 2019 AFC Asian Cup and two consecutive defeats from Bahrain and Iraq in the second round of qualifiers for the 2022 FIFA World Cup. The Team Melli finished top of the group stage, where won all of his remaining four matches to qualify to 2023 AFC Asian Cup and the final round of the World Cup.

Style of play
 Regarded as one of the most reliable a defenders in the AFC Champions League in high-pressure situations. He is known for his awareness, carrying the ball forward and also showed some impressive offensive ability. He is highly regarded by the fans and coaches for his on-the-pitch bravery. Khalilzadeh is the preferred defender for most coaches, especially the Croats Miroslav Blažević, Zlatko Kranjčar, Branko Ivanković and Dragan Skočić.

Personal life
Khalilzadeh was born in the small village of Gālesh Kolā in Bahnemir District, Babolsar County, Mazandaran Province, to a family working in agriculture and fish farming on the Caspian Sea.

Career statistics

Club

International

Scores and results list Iran's goal tally first.

Honours

Sepahan
Persian Gulf Pro League: 2014–15

Persepolis
Persian Gulf Pro League (3): 2017–18, 2018–19, 2019–20
Hazfi Cup: 2018–19
Iranian Super Cup (3): 2017, 2018, 2019
AFC Champions League runner-up: 2018
Individual
AFC Champions League group stage Best Centre Defender: 2016, 2019
AFC Champions League Best Centre Defender: 2018, 2020
AFC Champions League Team of the Year: 2018, 2020 West
Iran Pro League Best Centre Defender: 2018–19
AFC Champions League Best Goal: 2019, 2020 West
AFC Champions League OPTA Player of the Week: 2020 Semi-finals
AFC Champions League Top Passes: 2018 (553 Passes as defender), 2020 (598 Passes)
AFC Champions League group stage Top Long Passes: 2021 West (58 Passes)

References

External links

1989 births
Living people
Sportspeople from Mazandaran province
Iranian footballers
Iran international footballers
Association football defenders
Mes Rafsanjan players
Sanat Mes Kerman F.C. players
Sepahan S.C. footballers
Tractor S.C. players
Persepolis F.C. players
Al-Rayyan SC players
Al Ahli SC (Doha) players
Azadegan League players
Persian Gulf Pro League players
Qatar Stars League players
Iranian expatriate footballers
Expatriate footballers in Qatar
Iranian expatriate sportspeople in Qatar
2022 FIFA World Cup players